Yolk of the Golden Egg is the second full-length album by Canadian post-industrial band Dandi Wind.  All songs were written and produced by Szam Findlay, with Dandilion Wind Opaine providing vocals.

Critical reception
CITR-FM described the album as "violent in spirit" and "not always accessible", yet still a "worthwhile...sonic journey that challenges every spectrum of electronica." Exclaim! wrote that the album was "the electro equivalent of a machinegun blowing the locks off of cheerier electro duos", claiming that Opaine's vocals are "the most aggressive of the instruments."

Track listing
(all songs written by Szam Findlay)
 Battle Of Verdun
 A Lifetime
 Adolescent
 Powerball
 Cocoon
 Baying Of The Hounds
 Silver Lying
 Midget Palace
 Yo Pinok
 Johatsu
 Foundling Circle
 Dance Of The Paralytic

References

External links
 Promotional Video by John Londono

Dandi Wind albums
2008 albums